Augustin Léon Guillaume (30 July 1895 – 9 March 1983) was a French general. He served in the French Army beginning in 1913, during World War I and World War II. From August 1951 to May 1954, he served as the Resident-General in French Morocco, and was responsible for the deposition and exile of Mohammed V. He ended his career as Chief of the Defence Staff and Chairman of the NATO Chief of Staffs' Committee from 1954–1956. He was born in Guillestre, Hautes-Alpes department, where he retired and served as the town's mayor. He died in Guillestre in 1983.

References

1895 births
1983 deaths
French generals
Grand Croix of the Légion d'honneur
20th-century French military personnel
French military personnel of World War I
French military personnel of World War II
École Spéciale Militaire de Saint-Cyr alumni
NATO military personnel
People from Hautes-Alpes